Brian Currin (born 20 September 1950) is a South African lawyer who was instrumental in the establishment of the Truth and Reconciliation Commission.

Currin practiced law in Pretoria from 1977 to 1987, specializing in labour law and civil and human rights, and now works in mediation and institutional transformation. In 1994 he was appointed by South African President Nelson Mandela to chair a Prison Audit Committee and was subsequently involved in the creation of the Truth and Reconciliation Commission. In 1987 he founded the National Directorate of Lawyers for Human Rights which he headed for eight years.

He has worked in Sri Lanka, Rwanda and the Middle East on political transformation. Currin now co-chairs the Sentence Review Commission in Northern Ireland, which decides on the early release of prisoners who have committed terrorism-related offences.

In 2000, he became an independent mediator in the Drumcree parading dispute and said that he hoped he could achieve a breakthrough in the mediation role because he was a completely independent outsider. But he quit his role in December 2001, saying that as Portadown Orangemen had withdrawn from dialogue, he was "unable to take the process any further".

Involvement in the Basque Conflict
Currin has been involved since 2004 in trying to help resolve the Basque Conflict. His work has been funded by the Joseph Rowntree Charitable Trust.

In the last years he is part of the international mediators team involved in the search of a negotiated solution for the conflict in the Basque Country between the Basque terrorist group ETA (Basque Country and Freedom) and the Spanish and French governments. In November 2010 this group was officially set up as the International Contact Group for the Basque Country. The Group had as mandate "to expedite, facilitate and enable the achievement of political normalization in the Basque Country"

This mediators team is not recognized by either the Spanish or the French government. The main associations of victims of ETA have asked him to leave this labour considering it as inadequate and harmful. Additionally, the main Spanish parties at the time People's Party and Spanish Socialist Workers' Party have criticized what they consider a lack of knowledge of the political reality in the Basque Country.

References

External links
Pen Pictures Sentence Review Commission; accessed 3 November 2007.
 Drumcree Dispute - Key figures BBC News NI; accessed 3 November 2007
Brian Currin - profile South Africa History Archive]; accessed 3 November 2007

Living people
1950 births
20th-century South African lawyers
South African human rights activists
White South African anti-apartheid activists
Place of birth missing (living people)
People from Pretoria